Mikkel Brund (born 6 March 2003) is a Danish professional footballer who plays as a centre-back for the U-19 squad of Danish Superliga club Randers FC.

Career

Randers
Brund joined Randers FC from the affiliate club Hadsten SK as a U-13 player. In July 2020, 17-year old Brund was on the bench against Esbjerg fB in the Danish Superliga and in the winter 2021, he began training with Randers' first team, before shortly after signing a new youth contract until June 2023.

On 7 March 2021, a day after his 18th birthday, Brund got his official debut for Randers in the Danish Superliga against Lyngby BK. Brund started on the bench, but replaced Simon Graves Jensen in the 95th minute.

References

External links

Danish men's footballers
2003 births
Living people
People from Hadsten
Association football defenders
Danish Superliga players
Randers FC players
Sportspeople from the Central Denmark Region